This article lists the winners and nominees for the NAACP Image Award for Outstanding Actor in a Television Movie, Mini-Series or Dramatic Special. Currently Blair Underwood holds the record for most wins in this category with four.

Winners and nominees
Winners are listed first and highlighted in bold.

1980s

1990s

2000s

2010s

2020s

Multiple wins and nominations

Wins

 4 wins
 Blair Underwood
 3 wins
 Idris Elba
 Laurence Fishburne
 Danny Glover

 2 wins
 Charles S. Dutton
 Cuba Gooding Jr.

Nominations

 7 nominations
 Idris Elba
 6 nominations
 Charles S. Dutton
 Danny Glover

 5 nominations
 Andre Braugher
 Laurence Fishburne
 Cuba Gooding Jr.
 Blair Underwood

 3 nominations
 Don Cheadle
 Louis Gossett Jr.
 Sidney Poitier
 Ving Rhames
 Jeffrey Wright

 2 nominations
 Mahershala Ali
 Wayne Brady
 Michael Ealy
 Chiwetel Ejiofor
 Terrence Howard
 Leon
 Woody McClain
 Mekhi Phifer
 Wesley Snipes
 Michael Jai White

References

NAACP Image Awards